Ohio's 4th senatorial district has been based in southwestern Ohio and now consists of almost all of Butler County.  It encompasses Ohio House of Representatives districts 51, 52 and 53.  It has a Cook PVI of R+13.  Its current Ohio Senator is Republican George Lang.

List of senators

References

External links
Ohio's 4th district senator at the 130th Ohio General Assembly official website

Ohio State Senate districts